Mäkiluoto or MacElliot is a Finnish island in the Gulf of Finland, just to the south of Porkkala peninsula. It is part of Kirkkonummi municipality.  The whole island is an unmanned military installation and access for civilians is heavily restricted. A number of coastal artillery guns are emplaced there.

External links

Map
Photo gallery

Finnish islands in the Baltic
Islands of Uusimaa